The COVID-19 pandemic was confirmed to have reached the U.S. state of Wyoming in March 2020. On April 13, 2020, Wyoming became the last state in the U.S. to report its first death from COVID-19.

Timeline

2020

March 

 March 11: The first case of COVID-19 in Wyoming, a woman in Sheridan County who had recently travelled domestically, was reported.
 March 15: Governor Mark Gordon recommended closing all public schools. On March 24, Yellowstone National Park closed to visitors.

April 

 April 17: The Democratic Party of Wyoming announced they would conduct their caucus through the mail. 
 April 20: Approximately 100 protesters confronted Governor Gordon in Cheyenne, calling for the state to be reopened.

May 

 May 4: Working groups announced to plan the reopening of the University of Wyoming campus.
 May 13: A new statewide order was issued, allowing K-12 schools to have in-person instruction.
 May 14: 688 new cases are confirmed with 7 deaths. The University of Wyoming announced the school was moving towards on-campus instruction for the fall semester. It requested $46 million of federal stimulus money to assist with the re-opening on campus.
 May 15: Restaurants and bars reopened with employees required to wear face coverings.
 May 18: Yellowstone National Park reopened to tourism. The East entrance in Wyoming opened while the West entrance in Montana remained closed. Cars lined up as early as 5:30 a.m. to enter the park. In addition, two more deaths were reported that day.
 May 19: Four nurses at the Wyoming Medical Center, the largest hospital in the state, tested positive for COVID-19. Although health officers warned of an increase in cases, there were no new state restrictions announced
 May 20: A child care center in Casper closed after one child tested positive for COVID-19.
 May 26: Wyoming health workers announced they were concerned to see there was a 42% drop in immunizations in the state throughout the month of April.
 May 27: A major rodeo, Cheyenne Frontier Days, was canceled for the first time since 1897.

June 

 Throughout the month of June, the Alzheimer Association offered free webinars on COVID-19 and caregiving.
 June 8: 17 deaths have been reported.

July 

 July 19: 25 deaths have been reported.
July 22: 10 cases are confirmed at the Wyoming State Penitentiary in Rawlins after staff members conducted 876 tests of COVID-19.

August 

 August 26: Nine people who tested positive reported attending the Sturgis Motorcycle Rally.

October 

October 26: By late October, with 3300 cases statewide, up from 500 in July, Wyoming had one of the highest infection rates per capita in the United States. An epidemiologist with the Wyoming Department of Health said "cases are growing far too quickly". Casper mayor Steve Freel said the city would not make wearing masks mandatory.

December 

 Igor Shepherd, a state health official, resigns after the Casper Star-Tribune reveals that Shepherd referred to the "so-called pandemic" and said it was a Russian-Chinese plot to spread communism. Wyoming has reported 37,000 cases and 200 deaths, and a statewide mask mandate began on December 7.

2021

February 

 February 25: All restrictions on personal care businesses, such as in nail salons, barber shops, massage parlors, and others imposed by public health orders will be lifted.

March 

 March 8: A COVID-19 strain from South Africa, named the Beta variant, is found in Teton County, Wyoming. On the same day, Governor Gordon also announced that the state would be fully reopened on March 16, ending the mask mandate.

June 

 As Wyoming was one of five U.S. states with less than 35% of its population vaccinated, Dr. Scott Gottlieb, former commissioner of the U.S. Food and Drug Administration, predicted the state was at risk for outbreaks of the Delta variant.

Governor's Task Force and Wyoming Hunger Initiative 
On March 17, 2020, Wyoming Governor Mark Gordon "announced the creation of five task forces designed to tackle the effects of the spreading coronavirus", and condemned hoarding in the state.

First Lady Jennie Gordon spearheaded the Wyoming Hunger Initiative to give much needed resources to nonprofits throughout the state. In May 2020 $40,000 was contributed to this fund to organizations such as the Wyoming Food Bank as well as to mobile food banks throughout the state.

Impact on the Wyoming business community 
Industries have had varying responses, with energy companies in the state trying to balance safety with continued productivity by imposing quarantine and travel restrictions. In April and May 2020 the Wyoming Business Council hosted a series of webinars for business owners to help them transition to re-opening their businesses.

On May 27, 2020, it was reported that the state of Wyoming would lose $1.5 billion in revenue due to COVID-19. Since Wyoming is one of seven states with no income tax multiple proposals were shared to address this revenue shortage such as spending cuts.

Impact on colleges 
As a result of COVID-19, the University of Wyoming decided to offer their courses for the summer of 2020 online. In mid-May the university announced they were working towards re-opening the campus for the fall 2020 semester. Community colleges announced a variety of closures, including a move to distance learning at Casper College, Central Wyoming College and Northwest College.

Eastern Wyoming College was granted approval from Goshen County Public Health to re-open on May 18. Employees from this university worked 50% remotely and 50% on campus.

Impact on Northern Arapaho tribe 
It was announced on April 21, 2020, that four members of the Northern Arapaho tribe had died from COVID-19. All four had lived in Fremont County. Tribe Chairman Lee Spoonhunter was quoted as saying, "These tribal members were our family members who were dearly loved."
Advocacy groups raised concerns COVID-19 could be having a disproportionate impact on Native American tribes as a result of higher rates of preexisting conditions such as diabetes. Some tribal members noted the crisis has also given community members the opportunity to share more oral stories. Similar to the national trend throughout the United States, people of color in the state of Wyoming were disproportionally impacted by COVID-19. As of May 18, 2020, 2.7 percent of COVID-19 cases were American Indian/Alaska Native. Six tribe members had died of COVID-19 as of May 20. Representative Andi Clifford, a citizen of the Northern Arapaho tribe, made an announcement about the 6th death on Facebook.

COVID-19 also had a major impact on the economy of the Northern Arapaho tribe as the casino on the Wind River Indian Reservation was converted into a location for quarantine run by Dr. Paul Ebbert.

Impact on sports 
In college sports, the National Collegiate Athletic Association cancelled all winter and spring tournaments, most notably the Division I men's and women's basketball tournaments, affecting colleges and universities statewide. On March 16, the National Junior College Athletic Association also canceled the remainder of the winter seasons as well as the spring seasons. High school sports were also cancelled. 
The 3A / 4A high school tournament played 2 games with no fans and then cancelled the tournament before most teams even played.
Student athletes at the University of Wyoming were scheduled to return to the Laramie campus on June 1, 2020. A two-week quarantine is required.

COVID-19 in Yellowstone 
The National Park Service has issued regular updates to closures in Yellowstone National Park based on CDC guidance. The Thermus aquaticus bacteria found in the thermal lakes in Yellowstone has been reported to be useful in testing for COVID-19. Controlling COVID-19 in Yellowstone has been logistically complicated as the national park spans three different states.

Yellowstone reopened to the public with a long line of cars at the east entrance on May 18, 2020, after being closed for seven weeks. Within two hours of opening 200 cars entered the park. The Wyoming entrance opened first to control the flow of tourism into the park. The park did not allow lodging, food service or any tour buses, and many visitors did not wear masks.

Protests 
Throughout April and May 2020, there were several protests in Wyoming against the government's orders closing the state. One small protest took place in April in Casper.

Statistics

Hospitalizations 
Source: Wyoming Department of Health

See also 
 Timeline of the COVID-19 pandemic in the United States
 Yellowstone National Park 
 COVID-19 pandemic in the United States – for impact on the country
 COVID-19 pandemic – for impact on other countries

References

External links 

 Information from the State of Wyoming

coronavirus pandemic
coronavirus pandemic
Wyoming
Disasters in Wyoming
Health in Wyoming